The Baku–Supsa Pipeline (also known as the Western Route Export Pipeline and Western Early Oil Pipeline) is an  long oil pipeline, which runs from the Sangachal Terminal near Baku to the Supsa terminal in Georgia. It transports oil from the Azeri-Chirag-Guneshli field. The pipeline is operated by BP.

History
The preparations for the pipeline's construction started in 1994. On 8 March 1996, President of Azerbaijan Heydar Aliyev and President of Georgia Eduard Shevardnadze agreed on the establishment of Baku–Supsa pipeline. The trilateral contract was signed between Azerbaijan International Operating Company, SOCAR and the Government of Georgia. At the same year the lead contract of the project was awarded to Kværner. The pipeline was completed in 1998. On 17 April 1999, the inauguration ceremony of the Supsa Oil Terminal took place. The total costs of the construction of the pipeline and terminal were US$556 million.

The oil transportation by the pipeline was stopped on 21 October 2006 after abnormalities were revealed during the inspections on the pipeline. The large scale repair and replacement included replacement and re-routing of pipeline sections near Zestaponi in Georgia and Kura River crossing in Azerbaijan. Also several defects of the Soviet times sections were repaired. In total, the repair works cost US$53 million. The oil shipment restarted in June 2008.

After a major explosion and fire, which closed the Baku–Tbilisi–Ceyhan pipeline on 6 August 2008, the Baku–Supsa Pipeline was used to re-route Azeri oil deliveries. On 12 August 2008, BP closed the pipeline temporarily for safety reasons because of the South Ossetia conflict. On August 10th and 12th 2008, the Russian aviation had bombed the pipeline. In Summer of 2012 pipeline was down a month for a maintenance.

In July 2015 Russian troops demarcating the de facto border of the self-proclaimed Republic of South Ossetia, pushed forward the border line near the village of Orchosani and thereby taking control over a short length of the pipeline.
Analysts suggest that this was a Russian reaction to dissuade Georgia from making further moves towards joining NATO. 
 While conceding that the pipeline might need to be diverted in the future, a Vice President of SOCAR reportedly denied any short term need for such concern.

In June 2022, BP rerouted oil from the pipeline to the much bigger Baku–Tbilisi–Ceyhan pipeline due to security concerns.

Technical features
 
Essentially, the Baku–Supsa pipeline is a refurbished Soviet era pipeline with several newly built sections. It has six pumping stations and two pressure reduction stations in western Georgia. The four storage tanks at the Supsa terminal have a total capacity of 160,000 cubic metres.

From 1999 to 2016, 76.3 million tons of oil were transported through the pipeline. In 2021, it carried 4.2 million tons.

The cost of transporting one ton of oil through the pipeline is $3.14 (2016), out of which Georgia gets a $1.2 share and Azerbaijan gets the rest.

See also

Baku–Tbilisi–Ceyhan pipeline
Baku–Novorossiysk Pipeline
Energy in Georgia (country)

References

External links
 Western Route Export Pipeline (BP website)

Energy infrastructure completed in 1999
Oil pipelines in Azerbaijan
Oil pipelines in Georgia (country)
Caspian Sea
BP buildings and structures
Azerbaijan–Georgia (country) relations
Georgia (country)–Turkey relations
Azerbaijan–Turkey relations
Black Sea energy
1999 establishments in Azerbaijan